Sarah Rita Kattan is a Lebanese architect and scout leader, serving as Vice-Chairperson of the World Scout Committee the governing body of the World Organization of the Scout Movement from August 2021, the first Arab women to have such a role. She had served as a voting member from 2017. She is the executive director of a design and development foundation, "Design For Communities" (D4C), in Beirut.

Kattan began her scouting with the Lebanese Scouting Federation.

References

External links

World Scout Committee members
Scouting and Guiding in Lebanon
21st-century Lebanese women
21st-century Lebanese architects
American University of Beirut alumni
Academic staff of the Polytechnic University of Milan
People from Beirut
Living people
Year of birth missing (living people)